Okezie Victor Ikpeazu (born 18 October 1964) is a Nigerian politician who serves as the Governor of Abia State, in office since 29 May 2015. He was elected on the platform of the Peoples Democratic Party. He was re-elected as the governor of Abia state after winning the 9 March gubernatorial election.

Early life and professional career
Okezie was born on 18 October 1964, to the family of late Pa Ishmael and Deaconess Bessie Ikpeazu of Umuebere in Umuobiakwa village, Isialaukwu, Mbato Autonomous Community in Obingwa Local Government Area of Abia State, Nigeria. Ikpeazu attended Amaise Central Primary School, Umuobiakwa. In 1973, while in primary five, he gained admission into Eziama High School, Aba and later moved to Ihie High School, Isiala Ngwa where he took his School certificate examination in 1979. In 1980, at the age of 16, he gained admission into the University of Maiduguri to study Clinical Biochemistry and graduated with a B.Sc. (Hons.) Second Class Upper Division in August, 1984.

From August 1984 to August 1985, he served as a Clinical Biochemist in the Medical Laboratory of the Rivers State University of Science and Technology, Port Harcourt for his National Youth Service. Okezie Ikpeazu returned to the University of Maiduguri for an M.Sc Degree in Biochemical Toxicology and graduated in 1990. In 1994, at the age of 30, he obtained a Doctorate Degree, Ph.D in Biochemical Pharmacology from the University of Calabar.

Before joining politics, Okezie Ikpeazu had been a lecturer in several Nigerian educational institutions.

Political career
On 31 December 2015, a Court of Appeal sitting in Owerri sacked Ikpeazu as Governor and declared Alex Otti as the winner of the 2015 gubernatorial election held on 11 April and 25 April 2015. On 27 June 2016, Justice Okon Abang of the Federal High Court,  Abuja ordered Ikpeazu to vacate his office as governor upon allegations of false information and forgery of documents prior to the 2015 gubernatorial election. The suit was however dismissed by a Federal High Court in Owerri. Okezie Ikpeazu ran for a second term under his party, PDP and emerged the winner of the election, hereby welcoming his second term as Governor of Abia State. Ikpeazu contested for 2023 senatorial election in Abia south and failed.

Contracts corruption allegations 
In November 2020, the Peoples Gazette released a report reviewing Abia State financial records from 2016 and 2017. The records showed a suspicious amount of government funds having been wired to associates of Ikpeazu and their companies, including an estimated ₦3.4 billion to three companies owned by Enyinnaya Nwafor and ₦412 million in contracts to a company owned by Innocent Adiele.

Personal life
Ikpeazu is a member of the Seventh-day Adventist Church.

See also

 List of Governors of Abia State

References

1964 births
Living people
Nigerian Roman Catholics
People from Abia State
Igbo politicians
Peoples Democratic Party state governors of Nigeria
University of Maiduguri alumni
University of Calabar alumni
Rivers State University people
Nigerian Seventh-day Adventists